Demi Payne (born September 30, 1991) is an American track and field athlete whose specialty is pole vaulting. She is the daughter of American pole vaulter Bill Payne. Payne competed collegiately for Stephen F. Austin State University. She competed in the pole vault event at the 2015 World Championships in Athletics in Beijing, China. She won a bronze medal June 28, 2015 USA Outdoor Track and Field Championships Pole Vault with a height of 

Her personal bests have been indoors. She set her personal best in Albuquerque at 4.75 on January 24, 2015, which ranked her tied with Kylie Hutson for the fourth best American in history. On February 6, 2016, she improved upon that, first clearing a new personal best 4.76 to break the tie and to move into a tie for third with Sandi Morris. But on the same day Morris jumped 4.80 in Joplin, Missouri. Then Demi had the bar moved to 4.82, which she cleared on her second attempt. That jump put her in a tie for the tenth best performer worldwide, and was only one centimeter behind the second best American, Olympic Gold medalist Stacy Dragila. In one afternoon, she moved up the all time list to tie former world record holder Svetlana Feofanova for the fourth best female pole vaulter in history.

Two weeks later, Payne confirmed her position at the 2016 Millrose Games. In a close competition with Katerina Stefanidi, both athletes moved up the list, both clearing  on their second attempt.  Stefanidi won the competition because Payne took more attempts to clear her opening height of 4.50.  Stefanidi's previous personal best had been 4.77m from a year earlier. New Braunfels and Stephen F. Austin pole vaulter Demi Payne hasn’t fully recovered from a thumb injury sustained in April 2016 as of July 8, 2016.

She grew up with a pole vault pit in the back yard, but didn't start vaulting until her sophomore year of high school.  Payne first attended the University of Kansas for two and a half years where she was a mid-13 foot vaulter, but never made it to 14.  "I went out on the weekends and I pole vaulted during the week and it really wasn't No. 1 for me."  She said she got more focused while training after she learned she was pregnant.  She gave birth to daughter Charlee on October 22, 2013.  After transferring to Stephen F. Austin, to be closer to her family, she began marked improvement.  She set the indoor and outdoor NCAA records at the time, though both the outdoor pole vault record was surpassed by Sandi Morris.

Doping 
In August 2018, the United States Anti-Doping Agency revealed Payne tested positive for a banned substance, drostanolone, in 2016 and received a 4-year ban, backdated to March 31, 2016 and forfeited every result from March 12, 2016 on.

Competition record

USA National Championships

NCAA

References

External links

1991 births
Living people
Sportspeople from New Braunfels, Texas
Track and field athletes from Texas
American female pole vaulters
World Athletics Championships athletes for the United States
Kansas Jayhawks women's track and field athletes
Stephen F. Austin State University alumni
USA Indoor Track and Field Championships winners
Doping cases in athletics
American sportspeople in doping cases